Posey Oliver "P.O" Davis (1890–1973), was an American educator and administrator, as well as a pioneering agricultural editor and broadcaster.

He perhaps is best remembered as the longest serving director of the Alabama Extension Service (now known as the Alabama Cooperative Extension System) and for helping Alabama agriculture through a critical period of development.

Davis also emerged as a national leader of and advocate for farming and Cooperative Extension work in the 1940s and 1950s.

Early life

Davis was born in a rural hamlet known as Skinhead near Athens, Alabama, on Aug. 15, 1890, to Richard Scoggins Davis and the former Mildred Elizabeth Barker.  In a family genealogy written several years before his death, Davis recalled Skinhead as the place where his "depleted family settled after being blasted out of McMinn County, Tennessee, by the hell of the Civil War."

Davis also recalled that while this tiny community lacked intellectual and cultural sophistication, it was a place where "people go to church, treat their neighbors right, tend to their own business and still believe God is for the living and the dead."

After working for a while as a public school teacher from 1909 to 1912, Davis enrolled at Alabama Polytechnic Institute (now Auburn University), located in Auburn, Alabama, where he graduated in 1916.  From 1916-17, he worked as a horticulturist for the Alabama Agricultural Experiment Station, leaving to take a job as an agriculturist with Southern Railway.  He also worked briefly as an assistant boys club agent.

He married the former Mildred Kilburn, of Florence, in 1918.

Davis worked briefly for Progressive Farmer before returning to API in 1920 to serve as an agricultural editor for the Alabama Agricultural Experiment Station and the Alabama Extension Service.

WAPI

Shortly after assuming his new role as editor, Davis, however reluctantly, became one of the South's radio pioneers.

His involvement in this emerging medium followed after Birmingham News publisher Victor Hanson offered API $2,500 to establish a radio station to provide educational information to farmers and other API audiences. Recalling the incident more than 40 years later to then-Auburn University president Ralph Brown Draughon, Davis viewed the donation as practically meaningless, because it scarcely was enough to purchase the equipment to broadcast the signal, let alone to operate the station on a daily basis.  Another limiting factor was the scarce number of radio receivers available in Alabama at the time.

Unfortunately for Davis, the API administration, as well as his immediate supervisor, then-Alabama Extension Director Luther Duncan, fearing the bad publicity that would follow if they refused the donation, saw things differently. Davis, as the institution's editor and publicist, was assigned the task of securing funds and personnel to operate the new station.

It marked the beginning of a long, and as Davis recounted late in life, largely frustrating, association with this new medium.  Simply acquiring an engineer who knew anything about radio was challenging enough.

As Davis recalled, WMAV was installed on the evening of February 22, 1923.  By then, the Extension Service already had spent far beyond the initial $2,500 donation.

"We pecked and struggled as best we could with the equipment that was almost obsolete by the time it was installed," he recalled.

After acquiring entirely new equipment, Davis moved the facility to Comer Hall and acquired new call letters: WAPI, which are still carried by the station today.  Davis also was instrumental in working with agents to organize radio listening parties for audiences throughout the state — a practice that would foreshadow videoconferencing techniques common today.

After repeated unsuccessful attempts to affiliate with a national network — NBC or CBS — Davis decided to move the station to Birmingham after securing a pledge from city officials to provide half of the annual operating costs, totaling approximately $20,000.

As an additional cost-cutting measure, Davis also negotiated an arrangement with the University of Alabama and Alabama College at Montevallo (now University of Montevallo) to operate the station in partnership with API.

The arrangement with Birmingham and the other two institutions worked reasonably well, Davis recalls, until the onset of the Great Depression in 1929, after which the cash-strapped city was forced to renege on the deal.  This critical disruption in income forced Davis to lease the station — a "long and painful effort," as he recalled.

Even so, Davis did not find the effort entirely unsatisfying.  WAPI not only provided the three institutions with a broadcast presence but also ensured a "nice annual return on their investments" from about 1922 to 1961.

"Some day, I hope a competent historian will dig up all of the facts and write much more in detail than I have about WAPI — a comprehensive history," Davis stated in the Draughon letter. "I believe that it would be a story well worth writing and reading if done accurately and intelligently."

Publicist and Executive Secretary

All the while Davis served as WAPI general manager, he also carried on his duties as editor of the Extension Service and the Experiment Station.  He is distinguished for building one of the nation's leading public communications programs of his era.  His work as an Extension agricultural editor served as a model for Extension programs in other states for reaching farmers and other audiences through print and broadcast media.  In an era when agriculture comprised a major pillar of the U.S. economy, many of Davis' staff people were in hot demand among farm-related publications, agencies and businesses.

Davis was also considered a tireless Extension worker.  Records show that in 1925, he traveled almost 14,000 miles by train and more than 3,300 miles by car to carry out his work.

People who worked with Davis recall that he never overcame his editing proclivities even after he became Extension director, frequently correcting grammatical and syntactical lapses in reports and other documents.

From 1933-36, he also wore two other professional hats, serving Alabama Extension as executive secretary and registrar.

Extension Director, 1937-1959

Following predecessor Luther Duncan's ascension to the API presidency in 1937, Davis was appointed director of the Alabama Extension Service, going on to become the longest tenured director in Alabama Extension history.

Davis was considered an idealist and one who was far less politically motivated than Duncan.  The cerebral Davis also was criticized for not identifying closely enough with farmers — he "didn't have enough dirt on his shoes" to connect with the state's farmers, as one employee recounted years later.

In the view of many, though, he was an extrovert, also blessed with considerable communicative and organizational skills — attributes which, coupled with a deep devotion to the Cooperative Extension mission, more than compensated for any shortcomings.

National Farm and Extension Leader

As a result of his effective Extension leadership during the late Depression and through the war years, Davis emerged as a national agricultural leader and spokesman, which enabled him to influence the course of federal legislation throughout the Roosevelt years — in the view of some, a critical asset in an era when the federal government exerted an especially strong influence on farm policy.

Davis also was highly regarded as a public speaker, traveling throughout the South and through much of the nation sharing his views on the future of agriculture and Extension's evolving educational mission.

Personal philosophy

Like many American educators of his era, Davis firmly believed in the transformative power of scientific progress, frequently expressing effusive pride in the role Cooperative Extension had played as a change agent in mechanizing Southern farming and rendering it more efficient and profitable.

"Together, we're engaged in the finest type of education anywhere and by any people," said Davis, in an address to the Association of County Commissioners and Probate Judges in Mobile, Alabama, in 1956.  "In brief, it is scientific and technical information for sound and practical people where they live and work."

He often expressed exasperation with southern farmers who failed to heed the Cooperative Extension message, even describing the South as "a land of neglected opportunities" where producers were "not taking advantage of opportunities, little and big, around them and among them."
"With chagrin, I have known of southern families having to call on charity or upon government for food," said Davis, writing in 1938.  "To me, this is unthinkable except, of course, [in] emergency cases."

"Every farmer, either landlord or tenant, can have one or more fresh food products almost any day of the year, except after occasional hard freezes.  These, plus canned and dried products — also meat, milk and eggs, which can be produced at home — make a good diet, and plenty of it."

Davis was determined to step up efforts to reach farmers and their families who, for whatever reason, were not heeding the Cooperative Extension message.  In an article published in the Extension Review, he stressed that Extension workers must do a "bigger and better job of teaching and inspiring more people into action."

It was not enough merely to limit the Extension message to the small handful of farmers willing to become "Extension disciples," Davis stressed.  Instead, he envisioned and implemented a strategy that would reach all rural people with the "very best teaching methods at our disposal and the employment of the very best Extension workers."

Davis undertook a major technological overhaul of Alabama Extension field offices, providing each county office with "an addressing machine so that both big and little mailing lists can be used for effective contact through the mails."  Outlying offices also were provided with film-strip and stereopticon machines "so that each county worker may combine vision with sound in presenting facts at meetings."

Davis also expanded Alabama Extension's presence in both print and broadcast media.  He developed close working relationships with Alabama weekly and daily newspapers and with farm home publications.  Extension educational broadcasts were aired six days a week on most broadcast outlets in Alabama.

In addition, Davis oversaw the launching of "This Month in Rural Alabama," an 8-page tabloid that ran as an insert in 97 Alabama weekly newspapers.  With a publishing run of 100,000 weekly copies, it became the most widely circulated publication in Alabama.

Jeffersonian

Davis respected the role science had played in the rapid advancement of southern agriculture, but his faith in scientific achievement and progress was qualified. From his own experience working with farmers, he knew that stunning technological advances often brought new and even more complicated challenges.  One notable example was the huge improvements in cotton yields that farmers, working closely with Extension agents, had made in spite of the persistent presence of the boll weevil — an achievement that, in turn, led to a cotton surplus and the "attending headaches and difficulties now so prevalent."

The farm surpluses associated with improved cotton farming methods concerned Davis — so, for that matter, did the region's excessive reliance on the crop.

Largely because of this, Davis was an early and vocal proponent of farm diversification.

"It is plain to me that cotton, upon which we are relying very largely for money income, must have help," wrote Davis in 1937.  "It is also plain that livestock and poultry are cotton's best helpers."

A lifelong Democrat who maintained a cordial working relationship with the Roosevelt Administration, Davis nonetheless feared the long-term social and cultural effects of industrialization — effects already reflected in the growing number of Americans who were working for employers rather than for themselves.

"So, individual freedom as our ancestor knew it is largely gone because one who works for another is not exactly free in the sense that one is who finances his business and works for himself," Davis stated late in his Extension career.

He believed that farmers, along with small storekeepers and small businessmen, were essential to preserving freedom in America, because they were "part capitalist and part worker."

This Jeffersonian passion for farmers and small businessmen sentiment largely account for his intense interest in and sympathy for the Farm Bureau concept.

Without the cohesiveness Farm Bureaus around the country provided, farmers would be unable to withstand the onslaught of bigness in the form of both big government and big business, Davis believed.

Clash with Gov. James. E. "Big Jim" Folsom

Davis's goal of building up Extension to reach as many rural Alabamians as possible was not without its critics.  These critics included Gov. James E. "Big Jim" Folsom, who maintained that this zeal for Extension work often came at the expense of other agencies.

As ex-officio chairman of the API Board of Trustees, Folsom, working closely with his ally, Gould Beech, an API trustee, filed charges at a trustees meeting February 21, 1947, claiming that Alabama agriculture had suffered a relative decline in farm income, partly because of Davis' mismanagement of Extension.

Folsom also alleged that Extension failed to cooperate with other state and federal farm agencies and that it controlled the Alabama Farm Bureau, even choosing the president and delegates to Farm Bureau conventions.  The governor also maintained that Extension was too politically engaged and had even used its weight to defeat an income tax amendment.

Davis was eventually cleared by the trustees, who also passed a resolution commending him for his work.

Retirement

For a time in the 1940s, there was a tug of war between Davis and Elbert H. Norton, state school superintendent, to succeed Luther Duncan, the API president, who had died unexpectedly in 1947.

Davis retired in 1959 and was succeeded by E. T. York.  He spent the last few years of his life compiling a family genealogy of the Davis family and serving on several professional and charitable boards.  He also served as president of the Alabama Writers Council from 1962-63.

Among his honors, he was voted "Man of the Year" in Agriculture by Progressive Farmer magazine and awarded a medal and certificate from the American Farm Bureau in 1945 for distinguished service to American agriculture.  He was also listed Who's Who in America for 1952-53.

Notes

1890 births
1973 deaths
20th-century American educators
Agriculture educators
Auburn University alumni
Alabama Cooperative Extension System
People from Athens, Alabama
People from Auburn, Alabama